Lakeside Records has been the name of at least two different record companies.

The first Lakeside Records was a United States based record label in the years before World War I.  Lakeside was manufactured by Columbia Records, who made single-sided lateral-cut disc records to be sold via mail order by Montgomery Ward.

In the 1990s a different Lakeside Records produced compact discs of classical music.

See also
 List of record labels

Defunct record labels of the United States
Classical music record labels